Mario is a 2018 Swiss romantic drama film directed by Marcel Gisler.

Synopsis
Mario is an up-and-coming football star on a fifth-tier league near Thun. Captain, he has the most promising career in the league and works daily alongside his agent and manager, who is also his father, to ensure he will make it into a 1st League group in the coming year. During training for the current season, the team adds another striker, Leon, from Hanover. The two get along from the beginning and share a flat near to the field, where they begin a relationship. Claudio, another player in the team, starts to suspect, especially when Leon follows Mario during a trip of the team to a nearby training facility, outside Thun. While Mario and Leon's coach, and agents have no personal objections to their homosexuality, they do not want to risk the public and fans becoming aware, claiming there is a "certain image" to maintain in the world of football. Mario's father does not accept this relationship. Mario and Leon reluctantly agree to deny their relationship for the sake of their careers and make token attempts at public appearances with women. At the same time, they continue to receive under-the-radar abuse from some of their other teammates and Mario has a falling out with his father over the issue. When Leon discovers a dildo in his trousers in the locker room, he demands to know who on the team takes issue with his true sexuality. Mario, who has just learned he has been accepted to play first league in the new season, tries to ease the tension while simultaneously claiming he is in a relationship with "his girlfriend", who is in reality his best friend Jenny. Hurt that Mario so easily continues to publicly deny his homosexuality and their relationship, Leon quits the team and moves back to Germany. Heartbroken, Mario puts all of his energy into training, eventually receiving contract offers from both his hometown club and a club in Hamburg. Knowing Mario will want to play in Germany to be nearer Leon, Mario's agent meets with Jenny and convinces her to go with him, citing his need for emotional support. Mario scores the winning goal in the first match of the new season, garnering him press attention. While he and Jenny initially pose as a couple, Jenny succumbs to complexity required of being in a high-profile relationship and the two "break up". Mario visits Leon to apologise for his past behaviour, and in the hopes they can repair what they had, but discovers Leon has quit football seriously and has found a new partner. Leon explains that lying every day was causing him severe emotional distress, with which Mario empathises, but claims he "is not brave enough" to leave football behind in order to live as his true self.

Cast
 Max Hubacher as Mario Lüthi
 Aaron Altaras as Leon Saldo
 Jessy Moravec as Jenny Odermatt, Mario's best friend
  as Daniel Lüthi, Mario's father
  as Evelyn Lüthi, Mario's mother
 Andreas Matti as sports agent Peter Gehrling

References

External links
 
 

2018 LGBT-related films
2018 romantic drama films
2010s sports drama films
2018 films
Association football films
Films shot in Hamburg
Films shot in Switzerland
Gay-related films
LGBT-related romantic drama films
LGBT-related sports drama films
Swiss romantic drama films
Swiss German-language films
Swiss LGBT-related films